Giuseppe Orsi (born 24 November 1945 in Piacenza) is an Italian engineer, businessman, and corporate executive. He had a long career at Finmeccanica, Italy's leading high-technology group, and in November 2011 was appointed its Chief Executive Officer and Chairman.

Orsi was arrested by Italian police in February 2013 on bribery allegations in the Indian Chopper deal scandal, and was released after three months. However, on 9 October  2014, at the end of the proceedings of the first instance, he was fully acquitted ("the fact did not occur") of international corruption and bribery allegations in the helicopter case, and was sentenced to two years in prison (sentence has been suspended) for false invoicing. Orsi's lawyer, Giuseppe Amodio, has appealed against this punishment and affirmed that “with regard to the two-year sentence for false invoicing, a part of those invoices is linked to non-existent transactions. We are confident that this judgment will be reversed on appeal.”  However, in April 2016 an Italian appeals court sentenced Giuseppe Orsi to four and a half years in prison for corruption and falsifying invoices, overturning the previous lower court ruling. Orsi remains free pending an appeal to Italy's Supreme Court.

Education
Giuseppe Orsi is a graduate of Politecnico di Milano, from which he received a Doctorate in Aeronautical Engineering. Following University he attended the Wharton School, at the University of Pennsylvania where he specialized in Finance and Management.

He also served as an officer in the Italian Air Force and is a qualified civil pilot.

Career
Giuseppe Orsi began his career in 1973 at Siai Marchetti, (subsequently incorporated into Agusta) where he was Product Support Director.

Following the reorganisation of the Agusta companies into a centralised management structure in 1984, he was promoted to the Marketing & Strategies Directorate where he managed Agusta's international network of sales and representative offices.
Three years later he was appointed Sales Director of Agusta's Aircraft Division with responsibility for worldwide market development, strategy and negotiation.

In June 1989 he was elected President and Chief Executive Officer of Agusta Aerospace Corporation (AgustaWestland's North American production plant in Philadelphia) and in January 1994 he joined the reorganised Agusta International Sales Department as Senior Vice President, Government Sales and Programs.
In 1997, as Deputy General Manager of Agusta, he managed the company's presence in the international market and negotiated a joint venture with Bell Helicopters involving Tiltrotor and AB139 helicopters, saying that "Consolidating ownership of the AB139 will provide a single face to the customer, leading to increased sales and greater customer satisfaction related to follow-on support services."

In 2001, as Managing Director of marketing and sales, he was part of the Agusta and Westland (AgustaWestland) merger and he subsequently joined the 'Management Committee'. A year later he was appointed Managing Director of Agusta and COO of AgustaWestland's Italian operations.
In 2001, as Managing Director of marketing and sales, he was part of the merger of Agusta and Westland into AgustaWestland and subsequently joined the firm's Management Committee. A year later he was appointed Managing Director of Agusta SpA and COO of AgustaWestland's Italian operations. In 2004, he was appointed CEO of AgustaWestland, a post he held until 2011. During this period, AgustaWestland experienced significant growth in terms of sales, profit, EBIT, and cash flow.

In 2011 he was appointed Chief Executive Officer and Chairman of Finmeccanica SpA. He was made CEO and Chairman at a time when Finmeccanica had "endured years of scandal related to allegations of kickbacks, management impropriety and other problems connected to Orsi’s predecessor as CEO, Pierfrancesco Guarguaglini, and the political leadership of Italy’s former prime minister, Silvio Berlusconi." Although these scandals pre-dated Orsi, he had "not yet escaped taint," according to analysts. When Orsi took control of the firm, he sought to restructure it by selling off its "non-core divisions, including energy-engineering-services provider Ansaldo Energia, transportation-technology company Ansaldo STS and train and tram maker AnsaldoBreda." Orsi's restructuring plan for Finmeccanica reportedly "harmed his support within the firm.

In October 2011, Orsi forced the resignation of Lorenzo Borgogni, Finmeccanica's longtime head of external relations, after the latter admitted to interrogators that he had taken millions of euros in bribes from companies that had received Finmeccanica contracts.

Investigation of Indian helicopter sale

Prosecutors in Naples began investigating Orsi in the spring of 2011, shortly after he was promoted from CEO of AgustaWestland to CEO of Finmeccanica. Prosecutors were looking into whether AgustaWestland paid bribes to secure the €560 million sale of 12 helicopters to the Indian government and, if so, what role Orsi had in this scheme. The probe was triggered by accusations made by Borgogni, who supplied prosecutors with details of kickbacks supposedly paid by AgustaWestland to guarantee the purchase of the helicopters.

The payments were allegedly made by two Swiss businessmen Guido Ralph Haschke and Christian Michael, who acted as middlemen in a scheme also purportedly involving Orsi, Haschke's business partner Carlo Gerosa, AgustaWestland CEO Bruno Spagnolini. Borgogni charged that at least 10 million of a 51 million euro slush fund had been "funnelled back to Italy and paid to the Lega Nord party in return for its support to Orsi's bid to become president of Finmeccanica."

An April 2012 report by the Financial Times stated that the Naples probe was focusing on Orsi and that Finmeccanica considered Borgogni's charges to be trumped-up and motivated by a desire to bring down Orsi to avenge his dismissal from the firm. Another April 2012 report indicated that Naples prosecutors were gathering evidence in Switzerland about Finmeccanina's bank accounts purportedly opened in that country for the purpose of channelling kickback funds.

On 15 October 2012, Orsi’s lawyer said at a news conference that Orsi would resign if the Italian government wished him to do so, but that "his personal intention is to stay on, defend himself and demonstrate that accusations against him are groundless." In a front-page editorial about Orsi and Finmeccanica on 24 October, Corriere della Sera commented: "If the government does not want to, or does not know how to, give guidelines to management, then it should take the responsibility to sell it." On 27 October, a report stated that Orsi and Finmecannica were "under increasing public pressure as corruption probes into the firms' foreign sales continue to expand," with investigators now looking into possible irregularities in connection with contracts in Brazil and Panama, in addition to India.  An Italian analyst said that the investigations were "negative for Finmeccanica’s reputation, and it is not clear if Orsi will survive."

According to a February 2013, report, Finmeccanica's credit ratings had recently dropped, with Standard & Poor lowering it to BB+/B, from BBB-/A-3, which took its debt "below the investment grade level." It was noted that a year earlier, shortly after his appointment as CEO, Orsi had "presented Finmeccanica’s 2011 results and solemnly promised never again to have to discuss such dreadful numbers. As he details the 2012 financials on 12 March he can be sure the number crunchers will be pressing him for hard timing details of Finmeccanica’s disposal plans, not to mention a good explanation for why so little headway was made during 2012."

Arrest
On 12 February 2013, Italian police arrested Orsi, and Public Prosecutor Eugenio Fusco ordered him held in jail in Busto Arsizio, near Milan. Orsi's lawyer, Ennio Amodio, said in an interview that the arrests of Orsi and of Bruno Spagnoligni, his successor as head of AgustaWestland, "decapitate the heads of two companies that are important for the Italian economy." In a written statement, Finmeccanica expressed support for Orsi. A report stated that Orsi's arrest, coming shortly before a national election, was "particularly politically sensitive because the Italian state owns slightly more than 30% of the defence company, making it the single largest shareholder." Orsi said he would step down from his position if asked to by the government. A few hours after Orsi's arrest, Shashikant Sharma, Defense Secretary of India, said his government had ordered an investigation of the helicopter deal. On 13 February, Spagnolini was also placed under arrest and the Finmeccanica board appointed group COO and CFO Alessandro Pansa to serve in Orsi's place. Two days later, the firm announced that Orsi had officially resigned as chairman and as a board member. Orsi said he had resigned in order to "help calm the atmosphere."

The Wall Street Journal noted that Orsi's arrest came at a time when prosecutors in various Italian cities were "investigating the company on suspicion that it engaged in corrupt activities to win various types of contracts in Latin America, Asia and at home," probes that had led to other arrests. Massimo Vecchio, an aerospace analyst for Mediobanca, said that Orsi's arrest risked damaging the international reputation and competitiveness of Finmeccanica.

Orsi was held for some 80 days in pre-trial detention. On 4 May 2013, he was freed from jail pending trial. Prosecutors alleged that the kickbacks allegedly paid with Orsi's knowledge were standard practice at Finmeccanica.

Trial
Orsi and Spagnolini went on trial in Milan on 5 June 2013, on charges of fraud and corruption. According to the Wall Street Journal, the case had "convulsed" Finmeccanica because it "risked worsening its relationship" with a major client, the Indian government. In January 2014, the Indian government canceled its helicopter deal with AgustaWestland.

In July 2014, prosecutors asked that Orsi be sentenced to six years in prison for paying bribes. According to a September 2014 report in The Hindu, an investigation by Indian authorities had determined that around €60 million had been paid by AgustaWestland to clinch the Indian sale, with Christian Michel receiving €30 million, Orsi €12 million, and the rest going to Haschke and Gerosa to pass on to persons in India. Indian investigators had also reportedly determined that Orsi and Spagnolini later "entered into engineering contracts with two companies IDS Infotech and IDS Tunisia as a 'subterfuge' to pay kickbacks to middlemen and public servants in India."

On 30 September, in his final summation, Orsi's defence lawyer Ennio Amodio said that Orsi was innocent of all charges. Amodio said, "Orsi believed his role was to clean up old corruption and to do this he got rid of 40 people," including Borgogni, and insisted that Borgogni had only levelled accusations against Orsi "because he had been ousted by Orsi." On 9 October 2014, Orsi and Spagnolini were both sentenced to two years in prison for false bookkeeping and acquitted of international corruption in the helicopter case.

Awards
In 2010 Orsi was appointed as a Commander of the Most Excellent Order of the British Empire(CBE) and in the same year he was also named a 'Freeman of the City of London' by the Mayor of London.
He is also a member of the Royal Aeronautical Society (FRAeS).

References

1945 births
Living people
Italian chief executives
Commanders of the Order of the British Empire